Scandinavica may refer to:

Species
 Methylomonas scandinavica, Methylomonas
 Primula scandinavica, Primula
 Sarcocystis scandinavica, Sarcocystis

Ships
 MS Stena Scandinavica, ferry that goes between Gothenburg and Kiel
 MS Stena Scandinavica (1973)

Organisations
 Institution Acta Ophthalmologica Scandinavica
 Societas Arctica Scandinavica
 Societas Entomologica Scandinavica
 Societas Heraldica Scandinavica, aka Heraldiska sällskapet
 Societas Phlebologica Scandinavica, Scandinavian Society for Phlebology
 Societas Physiologica Scandinavica
 Societas physiologiaæ plantarum Scandinavica

Journals
 Scandinavica (journal)
 Acta Agriculturae Scandinavica
 Acta Anaesthesiologica Scandinavica
 Acta Chemica Scandinavica
 Acta Chirurgica Scandinavica
 Acta Gastrologica Scandinavica
 Acta Gynecologica Scandinavica
 Acta Masonica Scandinavica 
 Acta MEDA Scandinavica 
 Acta Medica Scandinavica, since 1989 known as the Journal of Internal Medicine
 Acta Morphologica Neerlando-Scandinavica 
 Acta Neurologica Scandinavica
 Acta Obstetricia et Gynecologica Scandinavica
 Acta Odontologica Scandinavica
 Acta Oecologica Scandinavica, aka Oikos
 Acta Ophthalmologica Scandinavica
 Acta Orthopaedica Scandinavica
 Acta Pathologica et Microbiologica Scandinavica
 Acta Pathologica, Microbiologica et Immunologica Scandinavica (APMIS) 
 Acta Paediatrica Scandinavica
 Acta Philologica Scandinavica 
 Acta Polytechnica Scandinavica
 Acta Psychiatrica Scandinavica
 Acta Psychiatrica et Neurologica Scandinavica
 Acta Physiologica Scandinavica
 Acta Rheumatologica Scandinavica
 Acta Scandinavica Juris Gentium 
 Acta Societatis Physiologicae Scandinavicae 
 Acta Socio-medica Scandinavica
 Acta Tuberculosea Scandinavica
 Acta Tuberculosea et Pneumologica Scandinavica
 Acta Veterinaria Scandinavica
 Documenta Medica Scandinavica 
 Entomologica Scandinavica , continued by Insect Systematics and Evolution 
 Ethnologia Scandinavica
 Fauna Entomologica Scandinavica 
 Fenno-Scandinavica 
 Folia Limnologica Scandinavica 
 Folia Scandinavica Posnaniensia 
 Mathematica Scandinavica
 Ornis Scandinavica, aka Journal of Avian Biology
 Rhetorica Scandinavica 
 Scientia Scandinavica 
 Studia Anthroponymica Scandinavica
 Studia Bibliographica Scandinavica 
 Studia Scandinavica 
 Titeldruk Indica en Scandinavica 

Books
 Scandinavica et Fenno-Ugrica (1954), by Björn Collinder